Saris is a surname. Notable people with this surname include:

Angeline Saris of American hard rock tribute band Zepparella
 (born 1942), Dutch physicist, former director of ECN Petten, and former professor of physics and dean of mathematics and natural Sciences at the University of Leiden
Ivar Saris (born 1993), Dutch professional pool player
 John Saris (c. 1580 – 1643), chief merchant on the first English voyage to Japan
 Mari Saris (born 1958), Dutch professional ice hockey player
 Patti B. Saris (born 1951), Chief United States District Judge
 Willem Saris (born 1943), Dutch sociologist

See also 
 Sari (disambiguation)#Surname